Agidel is a town in the Republic of Bashkortostan, Russia.

Agidel may also refer to:
Agidel Urban Okrug, a municipal formation which the town of republic significance of Agidel in the Republic of Bashkortostan, Russia is incorporated as
Agidel River, alternative name of the Belaya, a river in the Republic Bashkortostan, Russia
FC Agidel Ufa, name of FC Neftyanik Ufa, an association football club based in Ufa, Russia, in 1995–1996
HC Agidel Ufa, ice hockey team in the Zhenskaya Hockey League (ZhHL)